The Sword  is a public house at 45 Westgate Street, Gloucester, England, that is a grade II listed building with Historic England. It was formerly known as The Union and Molly's Bar.

References

Grade II listed buildings in Gloucestershire
Pubs in Gloucester
Westgate, Gloucester